Helion Lodge #1 is a Masonic lodge in Huntsville, Alabama. It is the oldest operating lodge of Freemasons in the state. According to Grand Historian Joseph Abram Jackson's Masonry in Alabama, it is "the birthplace of Freemasonry in Alabama."  Helion Lodge is also the common name for the building (actually named Eunomia Hall for Eunomia Chapter #5 Royal Arch Masons who financed its construction), built in 1911, where the lodge meets.

History
In 1805, a Revolutionary War veteran named John Hunt built a log cabin at the Big Spring and began what would grow to become the modern city of Huntsville, Alabama. Just six years later, on August 21, 1811, Madison Lodge #21 received its dispensation from the Grand Lodge of Kentucky. In 1812, it received its official charter from the Grand Lodge of Kentucky. John Hunt was among the first members, as was Leroy Pope, who had given the city its original name of Twickenham. On April 6, 1818, a second Lodge was formed in the county, Bethesda Lodge #2. In 1824 the two Lodges combined as Helion Lodge #1 under the Grand Lodge of Alabama.

Helion Lodge survived the dark years of the American Civil War, when Huntsville was often occupied by the invading Union Army. The quiet little town grew rapidly after World War II, when the area became host to both Redstone Arsenal and the Marshall Spaceflight Center. Notable members involved in the growth of Huntsville's defense and space industry are Senator John Sparkman and Mayor Joe W. Davis. Helion Lodge soon came to have the largest membership in the state. As a result, in 1962 a new Lodge was formed in Huntsville, Solar Lodge #914. Most of the members came from Helion Lodge. Five years later, in 1967, a third Huntsville Lodge was formed, Apollo #921. Both younger Lodges consider Helion as their mother Lodge and dual membership is common.

On Wednesday night, August 30th, 1922, Helion was the location of the formation of Twickenham Chapter of The Order of DeMolay; the first chapter of The Order of DeMolay in the state of Alabama.

Past Masters 1811-1899
1811	Marmaduke Williams -
1812	Louis Winston -
1813	David R. Moore - 
1814	David R. Moore -
1815	David R. Moore -
1816	David R. Moore -
1817	David R. Moore -
1818	William Atwood -
1819	William Atwood -
1820	William Atwood -
1821	Alexander Erskin -
1822	W. J. Grimes -
1823	W. A. Hutchinson -
1824	W. J. Grimes -
1824	Issac Williams  (Helion Lodge) -
1825	William Feeny -
1826	William Feeny -
1827	John J. Fackler -
1828	John J. Fackler -
1829	William Feeny -
1830	John Acklen -
1831	W. A. Hutchinson -
1832	W. A. Hutchinson -
1833	W. A. Hutchinson -
1834	W. A. Hutchinson -
1835	W. A. Hutchinson -
1836	W. A. Hutchinson -
1837	James Penn -
1838	James Penn -
1839	James Penn -
1840	James Penn -
1841	James Penn -
1842	James Penn -
1843	Ellison Smith -
1844	James Penn, MWGM -
1845	James Penn, MWGM -
1846	J. M. Davidson -
1847	J. M. Davidson -
1848	Arch E. Mills -
1849	J. M. Davidson -
1850	Fred Gate -
1851	J. J. Sample -
1852	J. J. Sample -
1853	J. F. Steele -
1854	William Gormley -
1855	William Gormley -
1856	William Gormley -
1857	William Gormley -
1858	William Gormley -
1859	William Gormley -
1860	William Gormley -
1861	William Gormley -
1862	William Gormley -
1863	J. E. Young -
1864	J. E. Young -
1865	E. B. Clapp -
1866	J. J. Dement -
1867	J. J. Dement -
1868	J. J. Dement -
1869	J. J. Dement -
1870	S. J. Mayhew -
1871	S. J. Mayhew -
1872	M. C. Baldridge -
1873	W. S. Reddick -
1874	Bernard F. Ludwig -
1875	Bernard F. Ludwig -
1876	M. C. Baldridge -
1877	M. C. Baldridge -
1878	John L. Rison -
1879	John L. Rison -
1880	John L. Rison -
1881	M. C. Baldridge -
1882	M. C. Baldridge -
1883	M. C. Baldridge -
1884	M. C. Baldridge -
1885	M. C. Baldridge -
1886	M. C. Baldridge -
1887	M. C. Baldridge -
1888	W. C. Weaver -
1889	M. C. Baldridge -
1890	M. C. Baldridge -
1891	M. C. Baldridge -
1892	Amos B. Jones -
1893	Amos B. Jones -
1894	Thomas Taylor -
1895	Joseph Skinner -
1896	Alred Moore -
1897	W. C. Wheeler -
1898	W. C. Wheeler -
1899	W. C. Wheeler -

Past Masters 1900-1999
1900	Unknown -
1901	W. C. Wheeler -
1902	H. C. Pollard -
1903	H. C. Pollard -
1904	Augustus F. Evans -
1905	Frank Ford -
1906	F. P. Culver -
1907	Leroy Suggs -
1908	Leroy Suggs -
1909	R. C. Brickell -
1910	J. H. Ballentine -
1911	J. H. Ballentine -	
1912	H. C. Pollard -
1913	J. W. Battle -
1914	J. L. Kendall -
1915	J. L. Kendall -
1916	J. L. Kendall -
1917	A. F. Kendall -
1918	G. H. Heymann -
1919	Alex M. Dunn -
1920	Alex M. Dunn -
1921	J. B. McCord -
1922	W. R. Laxson -
1923	Sam C. Alexander -
1924	Sam C. Alexander -
1925	Sam S. Rice -
1926	Sam S. Rice -
1927	Charles. O. Rolfe -
1928	Robert C. Chase -
1929	F. J. Shick -
1930	James D. Rice, Jr. -
1931	John S. McLure -
1932	John S. McLure -
1933	William B. Allen -
1934	William B. Allen -
1935	P. S. McCormick -
1936	Joe B. Hill -
1937	Cowan Y. Wilson -
1938	T. Pickens Gates -
1939	F. Floyd Broyles -
1940	John S. McLure -
1941	Henry R. Martin -
1942	Henry R. Martin -
1943	Clyde Martz -
1944	Clyde Martz -
1945	Abe Pizitz -
1946	Clyde Martz -
1947	Jasan A. Williams -
1948	John W. Walker -
1949	William B. Allen -
1950	John H. McGaha -
1951	L. L. Baucom -
1952	William B. Jones -
1953	E. H. Hall -
1954	William H. Ealy -
1955	D. Shelby Vaughn -
1956	Doyle W. Ealy -
1957	William A. Cobb -
1958	Dan L. Warden -
1959	J. D. Harris -
1960	W. L. Guthrie -
1961	J. C. Beeler -
1962	Wendell McKinney -
1963	Carl Pickens -
1964	Randolph Rush -
1965	Robert F. Jean -
1966	James W. Bass -
1967	James G. Williams -
1968	William W. Byrd -
1969	Charles D. Rozell -
1970	Charles Keathley -
1971	Emory J. Ferguson -
1972	Marlin Hinkle -
1973	Hubert Lemaster -
1974	Hollis L. Sharp -
1975	R. M. Slaughter -
1976	Robert J. Cannon -
1977	Fred Beddingfield -
1978	Clarence W. Landrum -
1979	Robert Kachelhofer -
1980	Ronald W. Thomas -
1981	B. J. Nelson -
1982	Alvie Berry -
1983	David Allen -
1984	Lee D. Parker -
1985	Johnie Wilbanks -
1986	James Garry Smith -
1987	James Wesley Reach -
1988	Wayne Dee Jordan -
1989	Clarence M. Albright -
1990	Donald Douglas Beal -
1991	David K. Hall -
1992	Charles R. Kirch -
1993	J. Shelby Aston -
1994	John W. Herron -
1995	Danny B. Lamont -
1996	E. J. Wadsworth -
1997	Theo Starkey -
1998	Ray C. Dunn -
1999	James S. Blanteno

Past Masters 2000-Present
2000	George Hall -
2001	John Pavlick -
2002	David Milam -
2003	Raymond Tanner -
2004	James Henley -
2005	Dennis Peterson -
2006	Larry Gilliss -
2007	Andy Thomas -
2008	Steve McGlocklin -
2009	Michael Feld -
2010	Jerry Burpee -
2011	Ed Kachelhofer -
2012	Ken Carpenter -
2013	David Miller -
2014	Jared Cassidy -
2015	George Lewis -
2016	Dean Lilja -
2017	John Hood -
2018    Mike Morgan -
2019    Doug Collinsworth -
2020    John D. Pennington -
2021    Thomas Jeffrey Beasley -
2022    Benjamin James Ledford -

Location
Helion Lodge stands on the original site of Madison Lodge #21 at 409 Lincoln Street in the Twickenham Historic District of Huntsville. The present building is over 100 years old and was designed by a noted architect and Lodge member named Edgar Love. The cornerstone was laid in 1911.

The building was officially named Eunomia Masonic Hall after the Royal Arch Chapter, but is now simply called Helion Lodge. It is home to both Helion Lodge and the Huntsville York Rite bodies, as well as to Twickenham-Milford Order of DeMolay and to White Light Assembly #66, International Order of the Rainbow for Girls. It is the home of the oldest Lodge of Freemasons in the state of Alabama.

Awards
Helion Lodge received the Masonic Service Association of North America's Mark Twain Award for Masonic Awareness in the lodge and in the community consecutively for the years 2008, 2009, and 2010. Helion Lodge received the Twain Award again in 2012. Helion Lodge is the only four time recipient of the Twain Award for Masonic Awareness.

Notes

References
Jackson, Joseph Abram. Masonry in Alabama : a sesquicentennial history, 1821-1971. OCLC 3931387

External links
Helion Lodge Webpage
Grand Lodge of Alabama - Helion #1
Grand Lodge of Alabama - Renaissance #933
Apollo Lodge history

Masonic Lodges
Buildings and structures in Huntsville, Alabama
Masonic buildings in Alabama
1811 establishments in Mississippi Territory